Robert Welsh may refer to:

J. Robert Welsh (1901–1990), American electric utilities executive
Robert Welch (disambiguation)

See also

Robert Walsh (disambiguation)